Ukraine competed at the 2001 Winter Universiade in Zakopane, Poland. Ukraine won 4 medals: one gold, one silver, and two bronze medals.

Medallists

Figure skating

See also
 Ukraine at the 2001 Summer Universiade

References

Sources
 Results in figure skating

Ukraine at the Winter Universiade
Winter Universiade
2001 Winter Universiade